The Ministry of Justice and Constitution (MoJC)   is the ministry that is responsible for the Judiciary and Constitution of Somalia.  The responsibility of the Ministry is to promote democracy, good governance and human rights through the development of policies and programs that enhance the enjoyment of social, economic and political rights.

History 
The Ministry was created in 1956 during the joint Somali/Italian administration with the aim of achieving a sustainable democratic system of governance that operates within a clearly defined and predictable legal environment.

List of ministers (Post-Independence in 1960)

 Sheikh Mahamud Muhammed Farah (1959-1961)
Abdurahman Hagi Mumin (1961–1966)
Sheikh Abdulghani Sheikh Ahmed (1970–1973)
Abdisalam Sheikh Hussein (1973–1978)
Ahmed Shire Mahmud (1978–1984) [Minister of Justice and Religion]
 Sheik Hussan Abdalle Farah (1984–1988)
 Mohamoud Said Mohamed  (1988–1990)
 Abdillahi Ossoble Said (1990)
 Hussein Sheikh Abdirahman "Matan" (1991)
 Mumin Omar (1991)*
 Mahmud Umar Farah (2000–2003)
 Ali Muudey Maahi (2004-2005)
 Sheikh Adan Mohamed 'Madobe' Nur (2005-2007)
 Hasan Dimbil Warsame (2007–2008)
 Abdirahman Mahmud Farah Janaqow (2009-2010)
Farah Sh. Abdulkadir Mohamed (2015) [Minister of Justice and Constitutional Affairs of Somalia]
Ahmed Hassan Gabobe (2015)
Abdullahi Ahmed Jama (2015–2017)
Hassan Hussein Hajji (2017–2020)
Abdulkadir Mohamed Nur (2020—2021)
Hassan Hussein Hajji (2021–2022)
Hassan Moalim Mohamud (2022—present)

*Somalia did not have a functioning government from late 1991-early 2000.

See also

 Justice ministry
 Politics of Somalia

References

Somalia
Government ministries of Somalia
2012 establishments in Somalia